The American Association of Acupuncture and Oriental Medicine (AAAOM), founded in 1981 and incorporated in 1983 as a 501(c)(6) organization, is the largest association of acupuncturists and acupuncture students in the United States.

Scope and operations
The AAAOM's stated mission is to represent Acupuncture and Oriental Medicine (AOM) practitioners and students and provide leadership on AOM issues in order to advance the profession of AOM in the United States and enhance public health and well-being.

History
1981: AAAOM is formed.
1983: AAAOM is incorporated in Washington DC.
1993: AAAOM splits into two organizations, the American Association of Oriental Medicine (AAOM) and the Acupuncture and Oriental Medicine Alliance (AOMA).
2001: Chinese Advisory Council (CAC) is formed and is assigned one seat on the board of directors of the AAOM.
2004: Korean Advisory Council (KAC) is formed and is assigned one seat on the board of directors of the AAOM.
2007: The AOMA and AAOM merge to form the AAAOM.
2010: KAC is dissolved.

References

Acupuncture organizations
501(c)(6) nonprofit organizations
Asian traditional medicine